Kundal Shahi (Kunḍal Šāhī) is an Indo-Aryan language spoken by about 700 people in the Kundal Shahi village of Neelam Valley in Azad Kashmir, Pakistan. It is an endangered language and its speakers are shifting to Hindko.

Phonology

The following tables set out the phonology of Kundal Shahi.

Vowels

Kundal Shahi is unusual amongst Dardic languages in that it has front rounded vowels.

Consonants

Like Kashmiri, Kundal Shahi is unusual amongst Dardic languages in that it lacks retroflex fricatives and affricates.

Tone

Kundal Shahi, like many Dardic languages, has either phonemic tone or, as in Kundal Shahi, pitch accent. Words may have only one accented mora, which is associated with high pitch; the remaining mora have a default or low pitch.

Endangered
Kundal Shahi is severely endangered with less than 500 speakers, most of whom are over the age of 40.

References

Bibliography

Further reading

External links 
 ELAR archive of Documentation of the Kundal Shahi Language, Kundal Shahi, Pakistan

Dardic languages
Languages of Azad Kashmir